The 1951 Detroit Tigers season was a season in American baseball. The team finished fifth in the American League with a record of 73–81, 25 games behind the New York Yankees.

Offseason 
 January 20, 1951: Marv Grissom and George Vico were traded by the Tigers to the Seattle Rainiers for Wayne McLeland.

Regular season 
On August 19, the Tigers played a doubleheader in St. Louis against the Browns. In the second game, after the Tigers had batted in the top of the first inning, the Browns sent midget Eddie Gaedel up to pinch-hit for leadoff batter Frank Saucier. Gaedel, at a height of 3'7", is to date the shortest player to appear in a Major League Baseball game. Umpire Ed Hurley challenged the decision to allow Gaedel to participate in an at-bat. Browns manager Zack Taylor produced a copy of Gaedel's contract. Tigers pitcher Bob Cain walked him. Jim Delsing pinch ran for Gaedel, but failed to score. The Tigers won the game, 6–2.

Season standings

Record vs. opponents

Notable transactions

All-Star Game 
The 1951 All-Star Game was originally awarded to the Philadelphia Phillies. The City of Detroit was celebrating the 250th anniversary of its founding in 1701 and requested to host the year's All-Star Game. Although the National League was scheduled to host the game in '51, the game was moved to Detroit's Briggs Stadium to coincide with the city's celebration. The Phillies instead hosted the 1952 All-Star Game at Shibe Park.

Roster

Player stats

Batting

Starters by position 
Note: Pos = Position; G = Games played; AB = At bats; H = Hits; Avg. = Batting average; HR = Home runs; RBI = Runs batted in

Other batters 
Note: G = Games played; AB = At bats; H = Hits; Avg. = Batting average; HR = Home runs; RBI = Runs batted in

Pitching

Starting pitchers 
Note: G = Games pitched; IP = Innings pitched; W = Wins; L = Losses; ERA = Earned run average; SO = Strikeouts

Other pitchers 
Note: G = Games pitched; IP = Innings pitched; W = Wins; L = Losses; ERA = Earned run average; SO = Strikeouts

Relief pitchers 
Note: G = Games pitched; W = Wins; L = Losses; SV = Saves; ERA = Earned run average; SO = Strikeouts

Farm system

Notes

References 

1951 Detroit Tigers season at Baseball Reference

Detroit Tigers seasons
Detroit Tigers season
Detroit Tigers
1951 in Detroit